Nicholas David Pope (born 19 April 1992) is an English professional footballer who plays as a goalkeeper for  club Newcastle United and the England national team.

Pope started his career in Ipswich Town's youth teams and after being released aged 16, he joined Bury Town. He signed for League One club Charlton Athletic in May 2011, before having loan spells with Harrow Borough, Welling United, Cambridge United, Aldershot Town, York City, and Bury. Pope joined Burnley of the Premier League in July 2016 and made his England debut two years later. He joined Newcastle United in June 2022.

Club career

Early career
Born in Soham, Cambridgeshire, Pope attended King's School in nearby Ely. An Ipswich Town season ticket holder, he began his career at the club's youth set-up at the age of 10 and remained with Ipswich until being released aged 16. Following his release by Ipswich, he joined non-League club Bury Town in 2008. Having challenged and temporarily replaced Marcus Garnham, Pope proved he was capable at that level when he wore the number one shirt for Bury Town for a number of first-team matches after initially debuting for the team at just 16 years of age. Manager Richard Wilkins described Pope as "the most naturally-talented player to progress through the ranks at the West Suffolk Sports Academy and Bury Town" and said "I honestly think Nick Pope can go all the way to the top." Pope was also a member of the West Suffolk College squad and has represented an England Colleges squad.

Charlton Athletic
On 24 May 2011, League One club Charlton Athletic signed Pope after he was spotted by scouts during a 2–1 win over Billericay Town. He was then invited to a trial at Charlton. After impressing staff during a trial, he was signed on a two-year contract after the two clubs agreed a compensation package, which included Charlton taking on the Suffolk outfit in a pre-season friendly ahead of the 2012–13 season. Charlton also paid for Pope to take a degree in sports science at the University of Roehampton alongside other courses which he had planned to take at the University of Nottingham before being signed by Charlton. On 7 February 2012, Pope signed a new two-year contract with Charlton. He made his Charlton and professional debut on 4 May 2013, in the last match of the 2012–13 season, as a 71st minute substitute for David Button in a 4–1 home win for Charlton against already relegated Bristol City in the Championship.

Pope signed a new three-year contract with Charlton in September 2013, and commented that "It's a big club so to have a long-term future secure, for me, as a player developing, it's something you look for".

On 5 June 2014, Pope signed a new four-year contract, securing his future to Charlton until June 2018.

Loan spells

In August 2011, Pope joined Isthmian League Premier Division club Harrow Borough on a loan deal lasting until 17 September 2011. Whilst there Pope kept three clean sheets and saved two penalty kicks in 19 appearances. Pope was then meant to join Conference Premier club Kettering Town in December 2011, but the deal could not be concluded due to Kettering being placed under a transfer embargo. As a result, he joined Conference South club Welling United on 21 December 2011 on a 28-day loan instead. On 7 March 2013, Pope joined Cambridge United in the Conference Premier on a one-month loan. Whilst at the club, he made nine appearances, keeping four clean sheets in the process.

On 26 September 2013, Pope joined Conference Premier club Aldershot Town on a one-month loan. He joined League Two club York City on 21 November 2013 on a one-month loan, but was recalled after only two matches by Charlton. On 16 January 2014, Pope rejoined York on loan for the rest of the 2013–14 season, keeping 16 clean sheets in 24 appearances.

On 6 January 2015, Pope joined Bury on loan for the rest of the 2014–15 season. He made his debut in a 1–1 home draw with Wycombe Wanderers on 17 January 2015. He made 22 appearances as Bury won promotion after finishing in third place in League Two.

Burnley

2016–2019: Cup keeper, first-team breakthrough, and injury
On 19 July 2016, Pope joined newly promoted Premier League club Burnley on a three-year contract for an undisclosed fee. He made his competitive debut in Burnley's shock 1–0 defeat to Accrington Stanley in the EFL Cup second round, with the winning goal coming from Matty Pearson in the last minute of extra time. He kept his first clean sheet for Burnley in their 0–0 draw at Sunderland in the FA Cup third round on 7 January 2017. He repeated the feat on his home debut, as the Clarets won the replay 2–0.

Pope made his Premier League debut on 10 September 2017, replacing the injured Tom Heaton in the first half of a 1–0 home win over Crystal Palace. He made his first Premier League start the following week, on 16 September, in a 1–1 draw against Liverpool at Anfield. He kept his place in the team and played in all of Burnley's remaining fixtures that season. On 9 October, Pope signed a new contract to keep him at Burnley until 2020.

On 26 July 2018, he suffered a dislocated shoulder after colliding with Sam Cosgrove during Burnley's 1–1 draw away to Aberdeen in the UEFA Europa League second qualifying round first leg. Burnley signed Joe Hart on 7 August to provide cover for Pope and Tom Heaton, who was also injured. Pope made his first-team comeback in Burnley's 1–0 home win against Barnsley in the FA Cup third round, but he did not play at all in the Premier League that season.

2019–2022: Burnley's number one
In May 2019, Pope signed a new contract with Burnley, running until 2023. On 1 August, Tom Heaton signed for Aston Villa, paving the way for Pope to become Burnley's first choice goalkeeper. He had a prolific 2019–20 season, as he featured in every minute of Burnley's Premier League campaign. Coming into the last match of the season against Brighton, Pope was level on clean sheets with Manchester City's Ederson, with both keepers having kept 15. In the 20th minute of the match against Brighton, Yves Bissouma scored, meaning Pope would finish the season with 15 clean sheets. Manchester City's final match against already-relegated Norwich City, ended 5–0 with Ederson keeping his 16th clean sheet, claiming the Golden Glove outright, narrowly beating out Pope. On 11 July 2020, Burnley drew 1–1 at Liverpool and became the only team to take points off the Reds at Anfield that season. Pope was highly applauded for his performance in the match, as he made eight saves to deny Liverpool a win.

Pope only missed two of Burnley's Premier League games in the 2021–22 season, but he could not save the Clarets from relegation after six consecutive seasons in the top tier. He signed for Newcastle United in June 2022. Coincidentally, his last game for Burnley was against his new club.

Newcastle United
Pope signed for Premier League club Newcastle United on 23 June 2022 on a four-year contract for an undisclosed fee, reported by Sky Sports to be £10 million. He kept a clean sheet on his competitive debut for the Magpies in their opening day 2–0 home win against Nottingham Forest. Pope was sent off for handling the ball outside his penalty area in Newcastle's 2–0 home defeat to Liverpool on 18 February 2023. His dismissal meant that Newcastle were without both their first and second choice goalkeepers for the 2023 EFL Cup final against Manchester United; Martin Dúbravka was cup-tied having played for the Red Devils in the third and fourth rounds during his loan spell. Third-choice goalkeeper Loris Karius made his debut as Newcastle lost the match 2–0.

International career

Pope was called up to the England national team for the first time on 15 March 2018. He was named in the 23-man England squad for the 2018 FIFA World Cup. Pope made his debut on 7 June 2018 as a 65th-minute substitute as England beat Costa Rica 2–0 in a pre-tournament friendly. He made his first competitive international appearance in a 4–0 win against Kosovo for the final game in UEFA Euro 2020 qualifying on 17 November 2019. In March 2021, after England defeated Albania 2–0, Pope became the first goalkeeper to keep a clean sheet in his first six appearances for the country.
Pope was selected for England's 2022 FIFA World Cup squad, but was an unused substitute behind Jordan Pickford as the Three Lions reached the quarter-finals.

Personal life
Shannon Horlock, daughter of former footballer Kevin Horlock, is Pope's long-term girlfriend.

Pope attended St Andrew's Primary School in Soham and was in the same class as murdered schoolgirls Holly Wells and Jessica Chapman.

Career statistics

Club

International

Honours
Individual
PFA Team of the Year: 2019–20 Premier League
Burnley Player of the Year: 2017–18, 2019–20
Burnley Players' Player of the Year: 2017–18, 2019–20
Premier League Save of the Month: August 2022, January 2023

Notes

References

External links

Profile at the Newcastle United F.C. website
Profile at the Football Association website

1992 births
Living people
People from Soham
Footballers from Cambridgeshire
English footballers
Association football goalkeepers
Ipswich Town F.C. players
Bury Town F.C. players
Charlton Athletic F.C. players
Harrow Borough F.C. players
Welling United F.C. players
Cambridge United F.C. players
Aldershot Town F.C. players
York City F.C. players
Bury F.C. players
Burnley F.C. players
Newcastle United F.C. players
Isthmian League players
National League (English football) players
English Football League players
Premier League players
England international footballers
2018 FIFA World Cup players
2022 FIFA World Cup players
People educated at King's Ely
Alumni of the University of Roehampton